The 2001–02 Air Force Falcons men's basketball team represented the United States Air Force Academy in the 2001–02 NCAA Division I men's basketball season. Led by 2nd-year head coach Joe Scott, they played their home games at the Clune Arena on the Air Force Academy's main campus in Colorado Springs, Colorado.

Roster

Schedule and results 

|-
!colspan=9| Regular season

|-
!colspan=9| 2002 Mountain West Conference men's basketball tournament

Air Force Falcons men's basketball seasons
Air Force
Air Force Falcons
Air Force Falcons